Cumberland Hill is a neighborhood in southeastern Lexington, Kentucky, United States. Its boundaries are Hickman Creek to the west, Clearwater Way to the north, Tates Creek Road to the east, and Forest Lake Drive to the south. It is served by the Cumberland Hill Neighborhood Association and also has a private community pool available for residents and nonmembers. The Cumberland Hill Catfish are the neighborhood swim team.

Neighborhood statistics
 Area: 
 Population: 1,906
 Population density: 6,107 people per square mile
 Median household income: $95,887

References

Neighborhoods in Lexington, Kentucky